The women's tournament of the basketball at the 2008 Olympics at Beijing, China began on August 9 and ended on August 23, when the United States defeated Australia 92–65 for the gold medal. All games were held at the Wukesong Indoor Stadium.

Qualifying

Format
 Twelve teams are split into 2 preliminary round groups of 6 teams each. The top 4 teams from each group qualify for the knockout stage.
 Fifth-placed teams from each group are ranked 9th–10th by basis of their records.
 Sixth-placed teams from each group are ranked 11th–12th by basis of their records.
 In the quarterfinals, the matchups are as follows: A1 vs. B4, A2 vs. B3, A3 vs. B2 and A4 vs. B1.
The eliminated teams at the quarterfinals are ranked 5th–8th by basis of their preliminary round records
 The winning teams from the quarterfinals meet in the semifinals as follows: A1/B4 vs. A3/B2 and A2/B3 vs. A4/B1.
 The winning teams from the semifinals dispute the gold medal. The losing teams dispute the bronze.

Ties are broken via the following the criteria, with the first option used first, all the way down to the last option:
 Head to head results
 Goal average (not the goal difference) between the tied teams
 Goal average of the tied teams for all teams in its group

All times are local Beijing Time (GMT+8).

Preliminary round
All times are China Standard Time (UTC+8)

Group A

Group B

Knockout round

Quarterfinals

Semifinals

Bronze medal game

Gold medal game

Final standings
Rankings are determined by:
1st–4th
Results of gold and bronze medal games.
5th–8th:
Win–loss record in the preliminary round group
Standings in the preliminary round group (i.e. Group A's #3 is ranked higher than Group B's #4.)
Goal average in the preliminary round group
9th–10th and 11th–12th:
5th placers in the preliminary round groups are classified 9th–10th; 6th placers classified 11th–12th
Win–loss record in the preliminary round group
Goal average in the preliminary round group

Statistical leaders

Points

Rebounds

Assists

Game highs

See also
 Men's Tournament

References

External links
Women's tournament official website

 
2008
Women's basketball
International women's basketball competitions hosted by China
2008 in women's basketball
Women's events at the 2008 Summer Olympics